Pembroke (or Pembroke Boroughs) was a parliamentary constituency centred on the town of Pembroke in West Wales.  It returned one Member of Parliament (MP) to the House of Commons of the Parliament of the United Kingdom, elected by the first past the post system.

History
For the creation and early history of the seat, see the Boundaries section below.

The constituency was abolished by the Redistribution of Seats Act 1885 for the 1885 general election, when it was replaced by the new Pembroke and Haverfordwest constituency.

For much of the eighteenth and nineteenth centuries the constituency was dominated by the Owen family of Orielton, the last of whom, Sir Hugh Owen, was defeated at the 1868 general election.

Boundaries
From its first known general election in 1542 until 1885, the constituency consisted of a number of boroughs within the historic county of Pembrokeshire in Wales.

Pembroke 1535–1832
On the basis of information from several volumes of the History of Parliament, it is apparent that the history of the borough representation from Wales and Monmouthshire is more complicated than that of the English boroughs.

The Laws in Wales Act 1535 (26 Hen. VIII, c. 26) provided for a single borough seat for each of 11 of the 12 Welsh counties and Monmouthshire. The legislation was ambiguous as to which communities were enfranchised. The county towns were awarded a seat, but this in some fashion represented all the ancient boroughs of the county, as the other boroughs were required to contribute to the member's wages. It was not clear if the burgesses of the contributing boroughs could take part in the election. The only election under the original scheme was for the 1542 Parliament. It seems that only burgesses from the county towns actually took part. An Act of 1544 (35 Hen. VIII, c. 11) confirmed that the contributing boroughs could send representatives to take part in the election at the county town. As far as can be told from surviving indentures of returns, the degree to which the "out boroughs" participated varied, but by the end of the sixteenth century all the seats had some participation from them, at some elections at least.

The original scheme was modified by later legislation and decisions of the House of Commons (which were sometimes made with no regard to precedent or evidence: for example in 1728 it was decided that only the freemen of the borough of Montgomery could participate in the election for that seat, thus disenfranchising the freemen of Llanidloes, Welshpool and Llanfyllin).

In the case of Pembrokeshire, the number of boroughs involved gradually decreased. The county town was Pembroke. The out boroughs which continued to participate were Tenby and Wiston. Haverfordwest was involved in 1542 only, as it became a separate constituency in 1545. Narberth, New Moat, and Templeton had dropped out by 1558. Newport, Cilgerran, and Llawhaden ceased to participate between 1603 and 1690.

In 1690–1832 the freemen of the three remaining boroughs of Pembroke, Tenby, and Wiston were entitled to vote. There was a dispute in 1702–1712 about the right of the Wiston freemen to vote. The Whig family of Owen of Orielton, which had the dominant influence in Pembroke, had the Pembroke Corporation bar the participation of the Wiston men (who were influenced by the Tory Wogan family). In 1712 Parliament upheld the rights of the freemen of Wiston.

There were 331 electors in 1710 (including non-resident freemen). The electorate increased to about 500 in the 1754–1790 period.

Pembroke Boroughs 1832–1885
This was a district of boroughs constituency, which grouped a number of parliamentary boroughs in Pembrokeshire into one single member constituency. The voters from each participating borough cast ballots, which were added together over the whole district to decide the result of the poll. In addition to the ancient right freemen voters, who retained the franchise after 1832, there was a new householder franchise applicable to all boroughs. The enfranchised communities in this district, from 1832, were the four boroughs of Pembroke, Milford, Tenby, and Wiston.

Members of Parliament
The Roman numerals after some names are to distinguish different members for this constituency, with the same name. It is not suggested this use of Roman numerals was applied at the time.

MPs in the Parliament of England 1542–1707
As there were sometimes significant gaps between Parliaments held in this period, the dates of first assembly and dissolution are given. Where the name of the member has not yet been ascertained or (before 1558) is not recorded in a surviving document, unknown is entered in the table.

MPs 1707–1885

Elections

Elections in the 1830s

Owen resigned, causing a by-election.

Elections in the 1840s

Elections in the 1850s

Elections in the 1860s
Owen's death caused a by-election.

Elections in the 1870s

Elections in the 1880s

References
 British Parliamentary Election Results 1832–1885, compiled and edited by F.W.S. Craig (The Macmillan Press 1977)
 The House of Commons 1690–1715, by Eveline Cruickshanks, Stuart Handley and D.W. Hayton (Cambridge University Press 2002)
 The Parliaments of England by Henry Stooks Smith (1st edition published in three volumes 1844–50), second edition edited (in one volume) by F.W.S. Craig (Political Reference Publications 1973)

Historic parliamentary constituencies in South Wales
Constituencies of the Parliament of the United Kingdom established in 1542
Constituencies of the Parliament of the United Kingdom disestablished in 1885
Politics of Pembrokeshire